Michael Jean Clervoix (born February 11, 1976), professionally known as Sha Money XL, is an American DJ, songwriter, record producer, and music manager from New York City.

Career
Clervoix was a producer for 50 Cent and the founder of Teamwork Music Inc. After Interscope granted 50 Cent his own label in 2003, Sha Money XL was president of G-Unit Records until 2007. He then was VP of A&R at Def Jam in May 2010, and produced Big K.R.I.T.'s Live from the Underground.  he is an executive at Epic Records.

Production discography

1997 

 Royal Flush - Ghetto Millionaire
 08. "Conflict" (featuring Wastlanz)

1999 

 Brixx - Everything Happens for a Reason
 07. "Can't Outplay Us"

2000 

 Half a Mill - Milíon
 12. "Ghetto Girl"

 50 Cent - Power of the Dollar
 15. "You Ain't No Gangsta"

2001 

 Tragedy Khadafi - Against All Odds
 03. "Crime Nationalists" (featuring Headrush Napoleon & Tasha Holiday)
 06. "Bing Monsters" (featuring Ja Rule & Headrush Napoleon)
 11. "Say Goodbye" (featuring Killah Shah & Dave Bing)

 Beanie Sigel - The Reason
 11. "Tales of a Hustler" (featuring Omillio Sparks)

 Cormega - The Realness
 10. "Get Out My Way"

2002 

 50 Cent - Guess Who's Back?
 06. "50 Bars"

 G-Unit - 50 Cent Is the Future
 16. "Bad News"

 G-Unit - No Mercy, No Fear

 G-Unit - God's Plan

2003 

 Lil' Kim - La Bella Mafia
 12. "Magic Stick" (featuring 50 Cent) (produced with Fantom of the Beat)

 50 Cent - Get Rich or Die Tryin'
 06. "High All the Time" (produced with DJ Rad and Eminem)
 13. "Poor Lil' Rich" (produced with Eminem)

 Tragedy Khadafi - Still Reportin'...
 08. "Walk wit Me (911")

 G-Unit - Beg for Mercy
 14. "Beg for Mercy" (produced with Big-Toni)

 Juvenile - Juve the Great
 13. "Juve the Great" (produced with Black Jeruz)

2004 

 Lloyd Banks - "The Hunger for More"
 08. "If You So Gangsta" (produced with Chad Beatz)
 11. "When the Chips Are Down" (produced with Black Jeruz)

 Young Buck - "Straight Outta Cashville"
 02. "Do It Like Me" (produced with Chad Beatz)
 15. "DPG-Unit" (featuring 50 Cent, Daz Dillinger, Lloyd Banks, Snoop Dogg & Soopafly) (produced with Black Jeruz) (United Kingdom and Japan Bonus Track)

 Snoop Dogg - "R&G (Rhythm & Gangsta): The Masterpiece"
 07. "Snoop D.O. Double G" (produced with Black Jeruz)
 14. "Oh No" (featuring 50 Cent) (produced with Ron Browz)

2005 

 Cormega - The Testament
 05. "Angel Dust"

 50 Cent - The Massacre
 03. "This is 50" (produced with Black Jeruz)

 Junior M.A.F.I.A. - Riot Musik
 14. "Do da Damm Thing" (featuring Aja)

 Slim Thug - Already Platinum
 11. "The Interview" (produced with Black Jeruz)

 Tony Yayo - Thoughts of a Predicate Felon
 04. "Tattle Teller" (produced with Black Jeruz)

 Various Artists - Get Rich or Die Tryin'
 03. "Things Change" (featuring Spider Loc, 50 Cent & Lloyd Banks) (produced with Black Jeruz)
 13. "You a Shooter" (featuring Mobb Deep & 50 Cent)

2006 

 Mobb Deep - Blood Money
 02. "Put 'Em In Their Place" (produced with Havoc & Ky Miller)
 Lloyd Banks - Rotten Apple
 01. "Rotten Apple" (featuring 50 Cent & Prodigy) (produced with Havoc)
 07. "Help" (featuring Keri Hilson) (produced with Ron Browz)
 17. "Life" (featuring Spider Loc) (produced with Chad Beatz) (United Kingdom Bonus Track)

 Lil Scrappy - Bred 2 Die - Born 2 Live
 13. "Baby Daddy" (produced with Ky Miller)

2007 

 50 Cent - Bulletproof
 01. "Maybe We Crazy"
 02. "When You Hear That" (featuring Tony Yayo)
 03. "I'm a Rider"
 04. "Simply the Best"
 05. "Pimpin', Part 2"
 06. "Not Rich, Still Lyin' (The Game Diss)"
 07. "Why They Look Like That"
 08. "Come and Get You"
 09. "I Warned You"
 10. "I Run NY" (featuring Tony Yayo)
 11. "Grew Up"
 12. "South Side"
 13. "Why Ask Why"
 14. "Hit You Ass Up" (featuring Tony Yayo and Lloyd Banks)
 15. "G-Unit Radio" (featuring DJ Whoo Kid)
 16. "Window Shopper (Remix)" (featuring Mase)
 17. "Movie Trailer"
 18. "Best Friend (Remix)" (featuring Olivia)

 Gorilla Zoe - Welcome to the Zoo
 15. "Last Time I Checked" (produced with Canei Finch)

2008 
Scarface - Emeritus
 12. "Unexpected" (featuring Wacko) (produced with Young Cee)

2009

2010 

 Stat Quo - Statlanta
 03. "Ghetto USA" (featuring Antonio McLendon)

2011

2012

2013

2014 

 Bobby Shmurda - Shmurda She Wrote
 05. "Wipe The Case Away" (featuring Ty Real)

2015 

 Mac Miller - GO:OD AM
 05. "100 Grandkids" (produced with ID Labs)

2016 

 Domo Genesis - Genesis
 02. "One Below" (produced with G Koop)

Personal life
Clervoix who is of Haitian descent, joined in on the relief efforts a year later in the aftermath of the 2010 Haiti earthquake that still left many people impoverished and homeless sending over money, food and clothes to Port-au-Prince, as well as his mother’s hometown of Limbé. He sought to create a Haitian hip-hop EP in collaboration with Creole Haitian rap stars such as Seca Konsa and among others.

He is cousins with DJ Whoo Kid.

References

1976 births
Living people
American music industry executives
American hip hop DJs
Musicians from Queens, New York
East Coast hip hop musicians
American hip hop record producers
American music managers
American people of Haitian descent
Record producers from New York (state)